Larinus latus is a species of true weevil. It is used as an agent of biological pest control against Onopordum thistles in Australia.

References 

Lixinae
Insects used for control of invasive plants
Biological pest control beetles